"Get Out of Your Lazy Bed" is the debut single by British band Matt Bianco, released in 1984, along with their debut album Whose Side Are You On?. The song became the band's first top 20 hit, peaking at No. 15 on the UK Singles Chart.

The song was used as the theme tune by long running New Zealand children's breakfast show What Now.

References

External links
 What Now? 1991 Christmas Special, includes Get Out of Your Lazy Bed music in opening sequence

1984 debut singles
1984 songs
Matt Bianco songs
Song recordings produced by Peter Collins (record producer)
Songs written by Danny White (musician)